Yep is a commercial document management computer program, available on Mac OS X.  

In its initial stages of development, Yep was named both “Pik” and then “Kip” but was renamed when it was discovered that the former was a registered trademark of another computer program and then the latter was an obscenity in the Norwegian language.

As of version 3.0, Yep runs only on Intel-based Macintosh computers; previous versions were universal binaries, which ran natively on PowerPC and Intel machines.

Features
The following is a list of key features:
Consolidates and tags all of your digital documents.
Allows fast searching, viewing and managing of all of your PDFs.
Optional integration with a scanner to import paper documents.

References

External links
 Official website
 Discussion: Yahoo Group
 Review: Mac Law Students
 Review: Musings From Mars
 Review: MacUpdate User Reviews
 Review: Mac News Online
 Review: MacApper

MacOS text-related software